Bokod, officially the Municipality of Bokod, , is a 4th class municipality in the province of Benguet, Philippines. According to the 2020 census, it has a population of 14,435 people.

History

Pre-colonial and Spanish periods
According to folklore, Bokod, once a heavily forested village, got its name from a man named Ebokot (or Ekbot), who introduced agricultural development to the area. Ebokot'''s name was associated with the village and was registered as a pueblo during the Spanish Regime.

American period
Bokod was established as one of the 19 townships of Benguet during the American Rule with the enactment of Act No. 48 on November 22, 1900.

On August 13, 1908, Benguet was established as a sub-province of the newly created Mountain Province with the enactment of  Act No. 1876.  As a result, six townships of Benguet were abolished, among them were Ambuklao and Daclan which were integrated into the township of Bokod.

Post-war era
One of the principal infrastructure in Bokod is the Ambuklao Dam. Built in 1950 and opened in 1956, it is one of the most important hydroelectric facilities in Luzon.

On June 25, 1963, President Diosdado Macapagal issued Executive Order No. 42 converting eight (8) of the thirteen (13) towns (designated as municipal districts'') of Benguet sub-province into regular municipalities. Bokod was among them.

On June 18, 1966, the sub-province of Benguet was separated from the old Mountain Province and was converted into a regular province. Bokod remained to be a component municipality of the newly established province.

Geography
It is bounded by Kabayan on the north-east, Atok on the north-west, Tublay on the mid-west, Itogon on the south-west, and Kayapa on the east.

According to the Philippine Statistics Authority, the municipality has a land area of  constituting  of the  total area of Benguet.

Barangays

Bokod is politically subdivided into 10 barangays. These barangays are headed by elected officials: Barangay Captain, Barangay Council, whose members are called Barangay Councilors. All are elected every three years.

Climate

Demographics

In the 2020 census, Bokod had a population of 14,435.

Economy

Government
Bokod, belonging to the lone congressional district of the province of Benguet, is governed by a mayor designated as its local chief executive and by a municipal council as its legislative body in accordance with the Local Government Code. The mayor, vice mayor, and the councilors are elected directly by the people through an election which is being held every three years.

Elected officials

Attractions

 Ambuklao Dam
 Mount Amalkatan
 Badekbek Sulfur Springs
 Palansa Panoramic View
 Bila Mountain Saddle
 Ekip Mossy Forest
 Palpalan Waterfalls
 Adwagan River
 Bobbok Second Growth Pine Forests
 Mount Pulag
 Mount Purgatory
 Mount Patoktok

Education

Public schools
As of 2014, Bokod has 37 public elementary schools and 3 public secondary schools.

Universities
 Benguet State University Bokod Campus (BSAT) (Ambangeg)

Private schools
 Immaculate Conception School of Bokod, Inc. (Poblacion)

Gallery

Notes

References

External links

 [ Philippine Standard Geographic Code]

Municipalities of Benguet
Populated places on the Agno River